Treehouse Trolls Forest of Fun and Wonder (1992) is a children's musical, live action video. It stars Danny Rutigliano and Rachael Harris.  Executive producer was Christopher A. Cohen, directed by Ernest Schultz, choreographed by Lawrence Leritz and costumes by Broadway's Alvin Colt.  Written by G. G. Smith. Released by Goodtimes Entertainment video.

Songs included
"The Wheels on the Bus"
"Take Me Out to the Ballgame"
"Who Stole the Cookie from the Cookie Jar?"
"The Treehouse Trolls"

See also
Treehouse Trolls Birthday Day

External links

Children's music
Dam dolls